Ed Bernard (born July 4, 1939) is an American actor best known for his roles as Detective Joe Styles on Police Woman, Principal Jim Willis on The White Shadow, and as Lieutenant Bill Giles on Hardcastle and McCormick.

Career 
Bernard is a television actor. He played Detective Joe Styles in 91 episodes of the television series Police Woman between 1974 and 1978. After Police Woman, he portrayed Jim Willis in the cast in the television series The White Shadow from 1978 to 1980 and Lt. Bill Giles on Hardcastle and McCormick from 1984 to 1985.

Bernard has made guest appearances on many television shows, including Mannix, Love Story, Kojak, Police Story, T.J. Hooker, In the House, and Becker.

Filmography

Shaft (1971) as Peerce
The Hot Rock (1972) Cop
Across 110th Street (1972) Joe Logart
Trader Horn (1973)  Apague
Love Story (1973), episode "A Glow of Dying Embers" as Peter
Police Story (1973–1974) various roles
That's My Mama (1974) Earl Chambers #1, Mailman (first 2 episodes only)
Mannix (1974) (TV series)  Bull Evans
Kojak (1974) (TV series)  Cleveland Watson
Together Brothers (1974)  Mr. Kool
Police Woman (1974–1978) Det. Joe Styles
Mork & Mindy (1978) (TV series) Officer Boyd
The White Shadow (1978–1980) (TV series) Jim Willis
T.J. Hooker (1982–1984) (TV series) Lt. Tom Reed / Willis
Blue Thunder (1983) as Sgt. Short
Hardcastle and McCormick (TV series) (1984–1985) Lt. Bill Giles
Survival Game (1987) Wilcox
Under Cover (1987) Chief Heffer
Intimate Stranger (1987) (TV movie) Captain Milliken
Homeward Bound: The Incredible Journey (1993) Desk Sergeant
Girl in the Cadillac (1995) Judge Horton
Pinocchio's Revenge (1996) Jail Guard
NYPD Blue (1999) (TV series - episode: "Voir Dire This") Judge Sheegmuller
Bare Witness (2000) (Video) Capt. Moody
Becker (2003) (TV series) Evans
ER (2005) (TV series) Mr. Klossey
Cold Case (2005) (TV series) Donald Williams

References

External links 
 
 
 

1939 births
Living people
Male actors from Philadelphia
African-American male actors
American male television actors
American male film actors
21st-century African-American people
20th-century African-American people